John Percy Hales  (b Birstwith 7 October 1870; d Southwell 6 September 1952) was a British Anglican priest, most notably Archdeacon of Newark from 1936 to 1946.

Picken was educated at Winchester and Jesus College, Cambridge. He was Rector of Cotgrave from 1897 to 1924; and then of Gedling from 1924 to 1937. He was also Chaplain to 8th Sherwood Foresters from 1913 to 1922 when he became Senior Chaplain to the 46th North Midland Division.

References

1870 births
1952 deaths
Alumni of Jesus College, Cambridge
Archdeacons of Newark
People educated at Winchester College
People from Nidderdale
English military chaplains
Officers of the Order of the British Empire
Companions of the Distinguished Service Order
People from Cotgrave
People from Gedling (district)
20th-century English Anglican priests